Chris Carter (born March 11, 1989) is an American track and field athlete who competes in the triple jump. He was the 2014 USA Indoor Champion in the triple jump.

Carter represented his country at the 2011 Pan American Games and the 2014 IAAF World Indoor Championships, finishing sixth at both events. He competed collegiately for the Houston Cougars. He was a six-time Conference USA champion in the triple jump, as well as a two-time long jump champion.

Career

Early life and college
Born in Austin, Texas to Sheila Phillips and Michael Carter, Chris Carter became involved in track and field sports at high school. Competing in horizontal jumps and hurdling events, he was the 2007 Texas State high school champion in the triple jump.

Set on collegiate competition, Carter chose to study at the University of Houston in recognition of its track and field facilities (Carl Lewis and Leroy Burrell were products of the college's Houston Cougars program). In his first academic year, he was triple jump winner and long jump fourth placer at the Conference USA indoor championship before going on to take third and second places at their outdoor championship. He focused more on jump the triple jump in 2009. Outdoors he jumped  to take second place at the Texas Relays and won his first Conference USA outdoor title. He qualified for the final of the NCAA Men's Outdoor Track and Field Championship and placed tenth. He also entered the 2009 USA Outdoor Track and Field Championships, but only ranked 18th.

Carter was the 2010 Conference USA triple jump champion indoors and out. He also improved his long jumping, clearing , and was conference runner-up indoors and fourth outdoors. He performed poorly at the NCAA Outdoors, however, managing only  to finish 18th in the triple jump. His final year of collegiate competition was also his best. He won four Conference USA titles, taking a clean sweep of the horizontal jumps indoors and outdoors. A personal record jump of  came in the triple jump at the NCAA Men's Indoor Track and Field Championship, bringing him fourth place in a highly competitive field. At the NCAA Outdoor Championship he competed in both jumps and placed 24th in the long jump and eighth in the triple jump.

Professional
This ranked him fourth behind Christian Taylor, Will Claye and Walter Davis. This performance earned him his first international selection and he ended the 2011 Pan American Games in sixth place. He struggled to capitalize on these progressions in the 2012 season – his best jump being  for third at the Mt. SAC Relays. He was eliminated in qualifying at the 2012 United States Olympic Trials. He came fourth at the USA Indoor Track and Field Championships and the 2013 USA Outdoor Track and Field Championships, though this meant he did not receive a call-up to an international competition.

He was unable to clear seventeen meters at the 2014 IAAF World Indoor Championships, but managed sixth place in the final.

Carter now coaches at Atascocita High School in Humble, Texas as a Cross Country/Track and Field Coach.

Personal records
Triple jump outdoor –  (2011)
Triple jump indoor –  (2014)
Long jump outdoor –  (2013)
Long jump indoor –  (2011)
400-meter hurdles – 53.90 seconds (2007)

Competition record

National titles
USA Indoor Track and Field Championships: 2014

References

External links
 
 

1989 births
Living people
American male triple jumpers
African-American male track and field athletes
Houston Cougars men's track and field athletes
Sportspeople from Austin, Texas
USA Indoor Track and Field Championships winners
Athletes (track and field) at the 2011 Pan American Games
Pan American Games track and field athletes for the United States
21st-century African-American sportspeople
20th-century African-American people